Charles Trumbull Boyd was an American captain who was most notable for his service and death in the Battle of Carrizal in the Mexican Revolution.

Biography
Boyd was born in Sperry on October 29, 1870. He would study in the United States Military Academy as a cadet from June 15, 1892 to June 12, 1896 where he graduated to Second Lieutenant of the 7th Cavalry Regiment and stationed at Fort Grant, Arizona. On March 24, 1897, Boyd was transferred to the Presidio of San Francisco with the 4th Cavalry Regiment.

Campaign in the Philippines
When the Spanish–American War and the Philippine–American War broke out, Boyd participated in the battles in and about Manila on Feb. and March, 1899; operations against Lateros and Pasig, March, 1899; operations against Malolos, March, 1899; operations against Balinag, San Miguel, and San Isidro, March and July, 1899; operations against Antipolo and Morong, June, 1899; operations against Paranaque and Las Pinas, June, 1899. For his service, he was promoted to major on July 5, 1899.

Regimental career
After his service, Boyd returned to the United States and served as a regimental commander for the 37th Volunteer Infantry from Sept. 18, 1899 to April 15, 1900. He then served as quartermaster for the horse transport Thyra from Sept. 15, 1900 to Nov. 3, 1900 and quartermaster of the Samoa from Jan. 10, 1901 to May 1, 1901 while being stationed  at the Presidio of San Francisco before moving to Camp A.E wood in modern-day Yosemite National Park and the Jefferson Barracks Military Post from May 2, 1901 to Oct. 23, 1902. He then served as Professor of Military Science and Tactics in the University of Nevada from Nov. 3, 1902 to May 12, 1905. Boyd traveled to Manchuria to undergo research on the Russo-Japanese War from July to October 1904. He was promoted to captain in Jan. 16, 1903.

Later service and death
Boyd was then transferred to Duluan and Cotabato and from Sept. 15, 1905 to Oct. 28, 1906, he served as Governor of Cotabato from Jan. 1, 1906 to Oct. 28, 1906 after he resigned at his own request and was then transferred to Fort D. A. Russell around Dec. 30 and 31, 1906, and Feb. 28, 1907 and then returned to the Philippines to accompany a regiment from March 1 to April 2, 1907 and then was stationed in Fort William McKinley from April 3, 1907 to April 14, 1909. He was then transferred in Fort Ethan Allen from May 14 to July 10, 1908 and would return to the fort from May 20, 1909, to Aug. 1, 1911. Boyd then became a member of Cavalry Rifle Team from June 4 to 29, 1910. He then went to Fort Leavenworth as a student officer at Army School of the Line, Aug. 4, 1911, to Aug. 15, 1912 when he entered the Staff Class while also becoming a Instructor at Camps of Instruction, Eastern Department, summer of 1912. Boyd was then relieved as student officer and participated in the Staff College until Dec. 15, 1912 where he returned to Fort Ethan Allen, as commanding Troop, Dec. 21, 1912, to Dec. 5, 1913; at Fort Huachuca, Arizona, and was then sent to the Mexican border, to Aug. 10, 1915 but then returned to Fort Leavenworth as a student officer at Army Staff College from Aug. 11, 1915, to May 22, 1916, when he was relieved and joined his regiment in the Pancho Villa Expedition into Mexico. Boyd would participate in the Battle of Carrizal against the Carrancistas on June 21, 1916 but would die from wounds and the battle would mark the end of the expedition. Boyd would later be buried in the Arlington National Cemetery.

References

1870 births
1916 deaths
American military personnel of the Spanish–American War
American military personnel of the Philippine–American War
United States Army officers
People of the Mexican Revolution
Military personnel from Iowa
American military personnel killed in action